Li Yuecheng (born October 1957) is a former Chinese politician who spent his entire career in his home-province Guizhou. He is of Miao ethnicity. He entered the workforce in March 1972, and joined the Chinese Communist Party in July 1976. As of January 2020 he was under investigation by the Communist Party's anti-corruption agency. Previously he served as Director of Agriculture and Rural Affairs Committee of the Guizhou Provincial Committee of the Chinese People's Political Consultative Conference (CPPCC).

Biography
Li was born in Taijiang County, Guizhou, China in October 1957. In his early career, he successively taught at Xinzhuang School, Bihen Middle School and Xueguan Middle School in Qinglong County.

He began his political career in March 1982, when he became a staff member at the Propaganda Department of CPC Qinglong County Committee. In 1987 he was promoted to Magistrate of Pu'an County, and then Communist Party Secretary, the top political position in the county, in 1990, at the age of 30. He has been hailed as "Child Magistrate". In 1996, he became Assistant Governor of Qianxinan Buyei and Miao Autonomous Prefecture, one year later he was promoted to become Vice-Governor, a position at vice-department level. In January 2003, he was appointed Party Branch Secretary and Deputy Director of Guizhou Supply and Marketing Association. In April of the same year, he became Party Branch Secretary and Head of Guizhou Provincial Audit Department. He was Deputy Communist Party Secretary and Governor of Qiandongnan Miao and Dong Autonomous Prefecture in March 2005, and held that office until November 2006. During his tenure, he led the leaders of ethnic minorities in Guizhou province to the United States for training and investigation. In November 2006, he was appointed Deputy Communist Party Secretary and Acting Governor and then Governor of Qiannan Buyei and Miao Autonomous Prefecture, and served until September 2011, when he became Director of the General Office of the Guizhou Provincial Committee of the Chinese People's Political Consultative Conference (CPPCC). In January 2012, he was Secretary-General of the Guizhou Provincial Committee of the Chinese People's Political Consultative Conference (CPPCC), he remained in that position until February 2018, when he was appointed Director of Agriculture and Rural Affairs Committee of the Guizhou Provincial Committee of the Chinese People's Political Consultative Conference (CPPCC). 

He was a delegate to the 11th National People's Congress.

Investigation
On January 9, 2020, he was put under investigation for alleged "violations of discipline and laws" by the Central Commission for Discipline Inspection (CCDI), the party's internal disciplinary body, and the National Supervisory Commission, the highest anti-corruption agency of China. On January 10, 2020, he was removed from membership of China's top political advisory body, the Chinese People's Political Consultative Conference.

References

1957 births
Living people
People from Taijiang County
Central Party School of the Chinese Communist Party alumni
People's Republic of China politicians from Guizhou
Chinese Communist Party politicians from Guizhou
Delegates to the 11th National People's Congress